The 26th World Science Fiction Convention (Worldcon), also known as Baycon, was held on 29 August–2 September 1968 at the Claremont Hotel in Berkeley, California, United States.

In 1968, Worldcon, annual World Science Fiction Convention, was combined with Westercon, the annual West Coast Science Fantasy Conference, sharing guests of honor and chairmen. The chairmen were Bill Donaho, Alva Rogers, and J. Ben Stark.

Participants 

Attendance was approximately 1,430.

Guests of Honor 

 Philip José Farmer (pro)
 Walter J. Daugherty (fan)
 Robert Silverberg (toastmaster)

Awards

1968 Hugo Awards 

 Best Novel: Lord of Light by Roger Zelazny
 Best Novella:
 "Weyr Search" by Anne McCaffrey and
 "Riders of the Purple Wage" by Philip José Farmer (tie)
 Best Novelette: "Gonna Roll Them Bones" by Fritz Leiber
 Best Short Story: "I Have No Mouth, and I Must Scream" by Harlan Ellison
 Best Dramatic Presentation: "The City on the Edge of Forever" (Star Trek episode, original script by Harlan Ellison)
 Best Professional Artist: Jack Gaughan
 Best Professional Magazine: if
 Best Fanzine: Amra, edited by George Scithers
 Best Fan Artist: George Barr
 Best Fan Writer: Ted White

Other awards 

 Special Award: Harlan Ellison for Dangerous Visions
 Special Award: Gene Roddenberry for Star Trek

Notes 

This Worldcon was the first one that was attended by large numbers of people in the hippie subculture. A psychedelic light show was presented in the main ballroom of the hotel. Robert Silverberg gave a speech about using LSD to attain a mystical experience. Harlan Ellison read a story he had written about a hippie commune.

Poul Anderson emceed a presentation by the Society for Creative Anachronism.

Long-time president of DAW Books, Betsy Wollheim (whose father, author and publisher Donald A. Wollheim, was a leader in the development of science fiction as a popular genre) remembers:

The high point of my childhood experience at conventions was Baycon 1968 in Oakland. I remember the excitement of it all—sliding down the fire slides, the big eucalyptus forest behind the Claremont Hotel...the tournaments on the lawn.... And I remember at the age of 16 thinking, "No convention can ever be this wonderful again, so I should never go to another." Famous last words!

See also 

 Hugo Award
 Science fiction
 Speculative fiction
 World Science Fiction Society
 Worldcon

References

External links 

 NESFA.org: The Long List
 NESFA.org: 1968 convention notes 
 Transcript of the 1968 Hugo Awards Ceremony

1968 conferences
1968 in California
1968 in the United States
Science fiction conventions in the United States
Worldcon